Juan Ignacio Pérez Soltero (born 8 March 1996) is a Mexican sailor. He competed in the Finn event at the 2020 Summer Olympics, finishing in 17th place.

Notes

References

External links
 
 
 

1996 births
Living people
Mexican male sailors (sport)
Olympic sailors of Mexico
Sailors at the 2020 Summer Olympics – Finn
Sportspeople from Guadalajara, Jalisco